The Nebraska Cornhuskers football team competes as part of the NCAA Division I Football Bowl Subdivision, representing the University of Nebraska–Lincoln in the West Division of the Big Ten. Nebraska plays its home games at Memorial Stadium, where it has sold out every game since 1962. The team is coached by Mickey Joseph.

Nebraska is among the most storied programs in college football history. Through 2019, the Cornhuskers rank seventh in all-time victories among FBS teams. Nebraska claims 46 conference championships and five national championships (1970, 1971, 1994, 1995, and 1997), and has won nine other national championships that the school does not claim. NU's 1971 and 1995 title-winning teams are considered to be among the best in college football history. Famous Cornhuskers include Heisman Trophy winners Johnny Rodgers, Mike Rozier, and Eric Crouch, who join 22 other Cornhuskers in the College Football Hall of Fame. Notable among these are players Bob Brown, Guy Chamberlin, Tommie Frazier, Rich Glover, Dave Rimington, and Will Shields, and coaches Bob Devaney and Tom Osborne.

The program's first extended period of success came just after the turn of the century. Between 1900 and 1916, Nebraska had five undefeated seasons and completed a stretch of 34 consecutive games without a loss, still a program record. Despite a span of 21 conference championships in 33 seasons, the Cornhuskers didn't experience major national success until Bob Devaney was hired in 1962. In eleven seasons as head coach, Devaney won two national championships, eight conference titles, and coached 22 All-Americans, but perhaps his most lasting achievement was the hiring of Tom Osborne as offensive coordinator in 1969. Osborne was named Devaney's successor in 1973, and over the next 25 years established himself as one of the best coaches in college football history with his trademark I-form offense and revolutionary strength, conditioning, and nutrition programs. Following Osborne's retirement in 1997, Nebraska cycled through four head coaches before hiring state native and 1997 National Championship quarterback Scott Frost in 2017.

Nebraska has played in 53 bowl games, including an NCAA-record 35 straight from 1969 to 2003, with a record of 26–27.

List of bowl games

Record breakdown

Notes

References

Nebraska

Nebraska Cornhuskers bowl games